{{Infobox book
| name             = Active Liberty: Interpreting Our Democratic Constitution
| title_orig       =
| translator       =
| image            = Active Liberty.jpg
| caption          = Active Liberty cover
| author           = Stephen Breyer
| illustrator      = 
| cover_artist     = 
| country          = United States
| language         = English
| series           = 
| subject          = 
| genre            = 
| publisher        = Vintage Books
| pub_date         = October 17, 2005
| english_pub_date = 
| media_type       = Print (Hardcover)
| pages            = 161
| isbn             = 0-307-26313-4
| oclc             = 59280151
| preceded_by      = Breaking the Vicious Cycle: Toward Effective Risk Regulation (1994)
| followed_by      = Administrative Law and Regulatory Policy: Problems, Text, and Cases (2006)
}}Active Liberty: Interpreting Our Democratic Constitution is a 2005 book by United States Supreme Court Justice Stephen Breyer. The general theme of the book is that Supreme Court justices should, when dealing with constitutional issues, keep "active liberty" in mind, which Justice Breyer defines as the right of the citizenry of the country to participate in government. Breyer's thesis is commonly viewed as a liberal response to originalism, a view espoused by Justice Antonin Scalia.

 Background Active Liberty is based on the Tanner Lectures on Human Values that Breyer delivered at Harvard University in November 2004.

 Reception 
In a review of Active Liberty'', Pierre Rosanvallon said that Breyer's arguments are convincing but they would be benefit from being "more firmly grounded if he had also touched on the Constitution's textual vagueness". Richard A. Posner of the University of Chicago Law School negatively reviewed the book, stating that, despite the merits of the book as a short and accessible but influential contribution to constitutional debate, is it not convincing to him.

References

External links
Tanner Lecture 2004

2005 non-fiction books
Works by Stephen Breyer
Books written by Justices of the United States Supreme Court